South Carolina Highway 389 (SC 389) is a  state highway in the U.S. state of South Carolina. The highway connects Neeses and Perry.

Route description
SC 389 begins at an intersection with SC 39 (West Railroad Avenue/Festival Trail Road) in Perry, within Aiken County. It travels to the southeast, enters Orangeburg County, and intersects SC 394 (Salley Road) at a point northeast of Salley. Less than  later, it intersects SC 3 (Capital Way). The highway continues to the southeast and enters the city limits of Neeses. It curves to the east-northeast and crosses over railroad tracks before meeting its eastern terminus, an intersection with U.S. Route 321 (US 321; Savannah Highway). Here, the roadway continues as Ninety Six Road.

Major intersections

See also

References

External links

SC 389 South Carolina Hwy Index

389
Transportation in Orangeburg County, South Carolina
Transportation in Aiken County, South Carolina